is a manga series written by Hideyuki Kikuchi and illustrated by . It was serialized in the Japanese seinen manga magazine Comic Birz from 1998 until 2002. The Sword of Shibito was also licensed   in English by Central Park Media and in French by 12 Bis.

The manga takes place in the Edo period of Japan.

Reception
Mania.com's Jarred Pine criticises the manga for its art, which is "a horrible mess". Animefringe's authors agreed and noted that "the cover art looks great and you get two pages in the manga that look excellent so it’s upsetting to see this".

References

External links

1998 manga
CPM Press
Fantasy anime and manga
Gentosha manga
Samurai in anime and manga
Hideyuki Kikuchi
Seinen manga